Bobo is the surname of:

 Elizabeth Bobo (born 1943), American politician
 Holly Bobo (1990–2011), American murder victim; see murder of Holly Bobo
 Hubert Bobo (born 1934), American football player
 Jake Bobo (born 1998), American football player
 J.B. Bobo (1910–1996), American magician
 Jonah Bobo (born 1997), American child actor
 John P. Bobo (1943–1967), American military officer
 Matthew Bobo (born 1977), American soccer player
 Mike Bobo (born 1974), American football coach
 Orlando Bobo (1974–2007), American football player
 Roger Bobo (born 1938), American tuba player
 Rosalvo Bobo, Haitian politician leader of opposition to U.S.-backed president Vilbrun Guillaume Sam during the 1915 United States occupation of Haiti
 Salha "Mama" Bobo, Syrian-American Jewish businesswoman
 Sireli Bobo (born 1976), Fijian rugby player
 Willie Bobo (1934–1983), American jazz percussionist